MQT may refer to:
Sawyer International Airport's IATA code
Marquette Rail's reporting mark